In Aztec mythology, Tlalocayotl (pronounced '*Tlah-low-kye-ottle') is the god of the East wind. His brothers are Cihuatecayotl, Mictlanpachecatl, and Huitztlampaehecatl, who personify the winds from the west, north, and south, respectively.

See also 
 Eurus
 Subsolanus

Notes 

Aztec gods
Wind deities